Adrenalin M.O.D. was a British all-male vocal and instrumental acid house pop group. The members were Richie Ferme, Maurice Bird, and Daren Mahomed. Their only chart success was called "O-O-O", which was released on the MCA label. It entered the UK Singles Chart on 8 October 1988, and reached #49; it was in the chart for two weeks.

References

British vocal groups